Thryptomene duplicata is a species of flowering plant in the family Myrtaceae and is endemic to Western Australia. It is a spreading shrub with upward pointing, egg-shaped leaves with the narrower end towards the base, and white flowers with five petals and about fifteen stamens in two whorls.

Description
Flowering occurs around December.

Taxonomy
Thryptomene duplicata was first formally described in 2001 by Barbara Lynette Rye and Malcolm Eric Trudgen in the journal Nuytsia from specimens collected by Trudgen near Binnu in 1993. The specific epithet (duplicata) means "doubled", referring to the number of stamens compared to that of other thryptomenes.

Distribution and habitat
This thryptomene is only known from a single population near Binnu where it grows in sandy soil in open shrubland.

Conservation status
Thryptomene duplicata is classified as "Priority One" by the Government of Western Australia Department of Parks and Wildlife, meaning that it is known from only one or a few locations that are potentially at risk.

References

duplicata
Endemic flora of Western Australia
Rosids of Western Australia
Plants described in 2001
Taxa named by Barbara Lynette Rye
Taxa named by Malcolm Eric Trudgen